The cihuacoatl (for "female twin"), was a supreme leader under the Tlatoani (Aztec emperor), or an esteemed advisor, within the Aztec Empire system of government.

Officeholders
 Tlacaelel (1420s–1487); office created for him
 Tlilpotoncatzin (1487–1503)
 Tlacaelel II (1503–1520)
 Matlatzincatzin (1520)
 Tlacotzin (1520–1525); final officeholder

In popular culture
The position features in four historical novels by Simon Levack.

See also
Class in Aztec society

Aztec society
Heads of state in North America